Kura is a contact centre company based in Glasgow, Scotland. They provide outsourced contact centre services and software, including customer service, retention, win-back, up-sell, cross-sell, web chat, complaints handling, appointment setting, general customer management and software development.

History

Kura currently operates with sites in Glasgow, Scotland and Sunderland, North East England.  
Kura announced on 28 June 2018 that they have expanded and acquired a business in Durban, South Africa.

Accreditations

Kura are members of the National Outsourcing Association. Inisoft are a technology partner of telecom equipment provider, Avaya.

References

External links

 

Call centre companies
Service companies of Scotland
Companies based in Glasgow
Telecommunications companies established in 1991
Business services companies established in 1991
1991 establishments in Scotland